Sally Barsosio (born 21 March 1978 in Keiyo District) is a Kenyan distance runner. , Barsosio is the youngest ever medallist at the World Junior Championships in Athletics, at 14 years and 182 days.

Career
In 1993, aged 15 years 153 days, she won the 10,000 metres bronze medal at the 1993 World Championships in Athletics after initially being disqualified for impeding fellow runners, most notably Elana Meyer who rather dramatically dropped out of the race. This made her the youngest ever person to win a medal at the World Championships in Athletics.

She was the winner of the inaugural Cross Internacional de Soria meeting in 1994.

Sally returned to the world championships in 1995 taking 11th place and in 1997 when she won the 10,000m gold medal, becoming the first Kenyan woman to win a senior track title. Adding to her position as the youngest medallist, this win made her the youngest ever champion of the 10,000 m.

She trains with PACE Sports Management and is coached by Ricky Simms.

Her sisters Florence Barsosio and Chepkemoi Barsosio and her cousin Susan Sirma are also Kenyan runners.

References

External links
 

1978 births
Living people
People from Elgeyo-Marakwet County
Kenyan female long-distance runners
Kenyan female middle-distance runners
Olympic athletes of Kenya
Athletes (track and field) at the 1996 Summer Olympics
Athletes (track and field) at the 2000 Summer Olympics
Athletes (track and field) at the 2004 Summer Olympics
World Athletics Championships athletes for Kenya
World Athletics Championships medalists
African Games gold medalists for Kenya
African Games medalists in athletics (track and field)
Goodwill Games medalists in athletics
Athletes (track and field) at the 1995 All-Africa Games
World Athletics Championships winners
Competitors at the 1998 Goodwill Games